Vern Fleming (born February 2, 1962) is an American former professional basketball player who played twelve seasons in the NBA from 1984 until 1996 for the Indiana Pacers and New Jersey Nets. He played college basketball for the Georgia Bulldogs.

As a college player at the University of Georgia, Fleming won a gold medal as a member of the United States men's basketball team at the 1984 Summer Olympics in Los Angeles and then commenced his professional career as the 18th overall selection in the 1984 NBA Draft by the Indiana Pacers. Fleming played point guard with the Pacers for eleven years, often sharing starter duties with both Haywoode Workman and Mark Jackson. Perhaps his best season as a pro came in 1990, when he started all 82 games of the season while averaging career bests of 14.3 points per game and 7.4 assists per game. The following season, on November 23, 1990, Fleming recorded a career high 18 assists, along with scoring 14 points, in a 112-111 win over the Houston Rockets. On April 2, 1994, while playing against the Orlando Magic, Fleming lost several teeth and suffered several lacerations inside his mouth after a collision with Shaquille O'Neal. Fleming spent the final year of his NBA career with the New Jersey Nets, retiring in 1997.

References

External links
Vern Fleming statistics at basketball-reference.com

1962 births
Living people
African-American basketball players
All-American college men's basketball players
American expatriate basketball people in France
American men's basketball players
Basketball players from New York City
Basketball players at the 1984 Summer Olympics
Georgia Bulldogs basketball players
Indiana Pacers draft picks
Indiana Pacers players
Limoges CSP players
McDonald's High School All-Americans
Medalists at the 1984 Summer Olympics
New Jersey Nets players
Olympic gold medalists for the United States in basketball
Parade High School All-Americans (boys' basketball)
Point guards
United States men's national basketball team players
21st-century African-American people
20th-century African-American sportspeople